A-kinase anchor protein 3 is an enzyme that in humans is encoded by the AKAP3 gene.

Function 

The A-kinase anchor proteins (AKAPs) are a group of structurally diverse proteins, which have the common function of binding to the regulatory subunit of protein kinase A (PKA) and confining the holoenzyme to discrete locations within the cell. This gene encodes a member of the AKAP family, and is expressed in testis only. The encoded protein contains an RII-binding domain, and is predicted to participate in protein-protein interactions with the R-subunit of the PKA. This protein is localized to the ribs of the fibrous sheath in the principal piece of the sperm tail. It may function as a regulator of both motility- and head-associated functions such as capacitation and the acrosome reaction.

Interactions 

AKAP3 has been shown to interact with:
 AKAP4 
 GNA13, and
 PRKAR2A.

References

External links

Further reading 

 
 
 
 
 
 
 
 
 
 
 

A-kinase-anchoring proteins